The 2015 Pan American Fencing Championships were held at the National Sports Stadium, in Santiago de Chile, from 17 to 26 April 2015. The event was organized by the Pan American Fencing Confederation and the Chilean Fencing Federation, with the support of the International Fencing Federation and with the sponsorship of the Chilean Ministry of Sport and the Chilean Olympic Committee. It gathered more than 220 fencers from 24 countries. It is a qualifying tournament for the 2015 Pan American Games in Toronto. It also belongs to the qualification road to the 2016 Summer Olympics.

Medal summary

Men's events

Women's events

Medal table

Results

Men

Foil individual

Épée individual

Sabre individual

Women

Foil individual

Épée individual

Sabre individual

See also
Fencing at the 2015 Pan American Games
Fencing at the 2015 Pan American Games – Qualification

References

External links 
 Schedule of the competition

2015
Pan American Fencing Championships
International sports competitions hosted by Chile
2015 in Chilean sport
Sport in Santiago
Qualification tournaments for the 2015 Pan American Games
Fencing competitions in Chile